Kotak General Insurance Company Ltd. is a general insurance company headquartered in Mumbai. It offers non-life insurance products like motor, health, home and others.

History 

Kotak General Insurance received the license to conduct general insurance business in India from the Insurance Regulatory Development Authority of India (IRDAI) in April 2015.

Key persons 
 Suresh Agarwal- Managing Director and chief executive officer (MD & CEO)

Products and services 
Kotak General Insurance provides various general insurance policies in India which are listed below-
Kotak Car Insurance
Kotak Two-Wheeler Insurance
Kotak Health Insurance 
It has a network of 4000+ network hospitals 
Kotak Home Insurance
Kotak Fire Insurance
Kotak Marine Insurance
Kotak Liability Insurance
Kotak Miscellaneous Insurance

Expansion since incorporation 

In April 2015, Kotak General Insurance received the license to start the business and since then it has a national footprint of 19 branches spread across India as in September 2020

References

External links
 

General insurance companies of India
Financial services companies established in 2015
Financial services companies based in Mumbai
Kotak Mahindra Bank
2015 establishments in Maharashtra
Indian companies established in 2015